For the 2019 Indian general election, the candidates for the Lok Sabha (lower house of the India parliament) of the Left Front are as follows:

Seat sharing summary

Statewise candidate list

Andhra Pradesh (8 out of 25)

Source: CPI(M)'s Website and Communist Party's Website

Arunachal Pradesh (1 out of 2)

Bihar (7 out of 40)

Chhattisgarh (4 out of 11)

Jharkhand (5 out of 14)

Kerala (20 out of 20)

Source: CPI(M)'s Website and Communist Party's Website

Tamil Nadu (4 out of 39) 

Source: First List CPI(M)'s Website and 
Communist Party's Website

Tripura (2 out of 2) 

Source: First List CPI(M)'s Website

Uttarakhand (3 out of 5) 

Source: CPI(M)'s Website

West Bengal (40 out of 42) 
Some seats are yet to be included

Source: CPI(M) West Bengal

Rajashthan (6 out of 25)

Maharashtra

References

LDF
Lists of Indian political candidates
Indian general elections in Kerala